André Horst Schürrle (born 6 November 1990) is a German former professional footballer who played as a forward.

He began his career at Mainz 05 in 2009, spending two years at the club before a £6.5 million transfer to Bayer 04 Leverkusen. His performances there gained the attention of Chelsea, who signed him for a reported £18 million in 2013. Schürrle played one-and-a-half Premier League seasons at the English club before joining VfL Wolfsburg for £22 million in January 2015, winning the DFB-Pokal and DFL-Supercup in his first year.

Schürrle was a full international for Germany from 2010 to 2017, gaining 57 caps and scoring 22 goals. He was a member of the German squads which reached the semi-finals at UEFA Euro 2012 and won the 2014 FIFA World Cup. During extra-time in the 2014 FIFA World Cup Final he provided the assist for Mario Götze's winning goal against Argentina. He retired from professional football in July 2020, at the age of 29.

Club career

Early career
Schürrle started his career at local club Ludwigshafener SC at age four, before joining 1. FSV Mainz 05 in 2006. He played as a defender before switching to his current position of an attacker. He spent three years playing for the club's youth teams, where he won the Under 19 Bundesliga in 2009 under coach Thomas Tuchel.

1. FSV Mainz 05
In August 2009, Schürrle made his Bundesliga debut in a 2–2 draw against Bayer Leverkusen on the opening day of the 2009–10 season. The following month, on 19 September 2009, Schürrle scored his first two league goals in a 3–2 away win against VfL Bochum before signing a professional contract with the club later in the week.

In September 2010, Mainz announced that Schürrle had signed a five-year contract with Bayer Leverkusen, and would join the club at the end of the 2010–11 season. The transfer fee agreed between the two clubs was believed to be in the region of €8 million.

Bayer Leverkusen
Schürrle completed his £6.5 million move to Bayer Leverkusen in 2011, signing a five-year contract with the club until the summer of 2016. He scored on his debut in a DFB Pokal tie against Dynamo Dresden. He had to wait until 15 October 2011 to open his Bundesliga account for Bayer Leverkusen, when he netted a late equalizer against Borussia Mönchengladbach, rescuing his side a point as the match finished 2–2. Schürrle registered his first European goal in the Champions League in a home win over Valencia four days later.

On 26 September, Schürrle scored his first goal of the season against FC Augsburg in a 3–1 win. In the fixture against Bayern Munich on 28 October 2012, Schürrle provided an assist for Stefan Kießling in a 2–1 win at the Allianz Arena. This gave Bayern their first loss of the season in the Bundesliga and gave Bayer Leverkusen their first victory in Munich since October 1989. On 30 March 2013, Schürrle scored twice in the match against Fortuna Düsseldorf, in a 4–1 win. On 20 April 2013, Schürrle scored a brace and made an assist as they defeated 1899 Hoffenheim 5–0 at home. Schürrle finished the 2012–13 campaign with a tally of 14 goals and 9 assists in 43 games across all competitions.

Chelsea

On 18 April 2013, it was confirmed that Bayer Leverkusen's director of sport Rudi Völler had travelled to London to hold talks with Chelsea over the transfer of Schürrle, although no fee had yet been agreed. On 13 June 2013, Chelsea confirmed via their official website that they had reached an agreement with Leverkusen for the transfer of Schürrle, with the transfer fee reported to be in the region of €21 million (£18 million). On 25 June 2013, Chelsea announced that they had completed the transfer of Schürrle, bringing an end to the Londoners' protracted pursuit of the German forward. With Schürrle signing a five-year contract, he was given the number 14 shirt. On 4 August, Schürrle scored his first goal in a Chelsea shirt in a pre-season friendly match against Milan during a tour of the United States.

On 18 August, Schürrle made his competitive debut for Chelsea, coming on as a 67th-minute substitute for Kevin De Bruyne in a Premier League 2–0 win over Hull City at Stamford Bridge. His first goal for Chelsea came in the 2–1 home victory over title challengers Manchester City on 27 October, where he scored from a cross by teammate Fernando Torres. On 7 December, he then scored two goals against Stoke City in a 3–2 defeat.

Schürrle scored his first Premier League hat-trick the following 1 March, against Fulham in a 3–1 away victory in the West London derby. Three weeks later, he assisted Samuel Eto'o's goal in the fifth minute and sent Chelsea into a 2–0 lead in the seventh minute at home to Arsenal; he was awarded Man of the match after Chelsea won 6–0. On 8 April, he scored in Chelsea's second leg UEFA Champions League match against Paris Saint-Germain, to advance to the semi-finals on the away-goals rule. His first season in England ended with eight goals in 30 Premier League matches.

On 18 August 2014, in Chelsea's first game of the new league season, Schürrle scored the second goal of a 3–1 victory away to Burnley, from a Cesc Fàbregas pass. This was later voted Match of the Days goal of the month. Chelsea finished the season as Premier League champions and Schürrle, despite going on to complete a transfer to Wolfsburg in early 2015, received a medal, having played 14 matches in the league season. He was not aware that he had played enough matches to earn a medal, and was surprised when manager José Mourinho texted him to tell him of the recognition.

Wolfsburg

On 2 February 2015, Schürrle returned to the Bundesliga, joining Wolfsburg for a fee of £22 million. Five days later he made his debut for the club, playing the entirety of a 3–0 home win over Hoffenheim and setting up goals for Bas Dost and Kevin De Bruyne. His first goal for the club came on 4 April, in a 3–1 win over VfB Stuttgart. On 30 May, Wolfsburg won the DFB-Pokal for the first time after beating Borussia Dortmund 3–1 in the final at the Olympiastadion in Berlin, Schürrle playing the final nine minutes in place of Maximilian Arnold.

Schürrle was a 63rd-minute substitute for Daniel Caligiuri as Wolfsburg won the 2015 DFL-Supercup on 1 August, scoring in the penalty shootout. On 25 November, after again replacing Caligiuri in the 61st minute, he scored both goals in a Champions League group stage win at CSKA Moscow.

On 1 March 2016, exactly two years after scoring his first club hat-trick for Chelsea, Schürrle recorded his first treble for Wolfsburg in their 4–0 win against Hannover 96. A week later he scored the only goal in a 1–0 (4–2 aggregate) win over Belgian side Gent to advance his team to the UEFA Champions League quarter-finals for the first time in their history.

Borussia Dortmund
On 22 July 2016, Schürrle joined Borussia Dortmund for an undisclosed fee. On 14 August 2016, Schürrle made his debut coming off the bench in 2–0 defeat against Bayern Munich in the DFL-Supercup.

Loan to Fulham
On 25 July 2018, Fulham announced the signing of Schürrle on a two-season loan. On 11 August, Schürrle made his debut in a 2-0 loss against Crystal Palace in the Premier League. On 26 August, Schürrle scored his first goal for the club in a 4–2 victory over Burnley. On 12 January 2019, he scored against Burnley again in a 2-1 defeat. His goal was later voted as Premier League Goal of the Month for January. His loan was cut short following Fulham being relegated from the Premier League.

Loan to Spartak Moscow
On 31 July 2019, Schürrle joined Russian Premier League club Spartak Moscow on a season-long loan. In his second league game on 11 August against FC Akhmat Grozny he scored his first RPL goal in a 3–1 win. On 1 July 2020, his loan expired and was not extended as he had not played for Spartak in 2020 due to injury.

Retirement
On 17 July 2020, Schürrle announced his retirement from professional football, at the age of 29. His decision came just a few days after he and Borussia Dortmund mutually agreed to terminate his contract. When speaking to Der Spiegel about retiring at a relatively young age, he stated that he no longer wanted to face the loneliness and endless competition inherent in top-flight football. Overall he played nearly 300 top-flight matches in Germany, England and Russia.

International career

Youth team
Schürrle made his debut in a UEFA European Under-19 Football Championship qualifying match against Luxembourg, which resulted in a 3–0 win. After impressing for 1. FSV Mainz 05 in the Bundesliga he was called up to the under-21 team in 2009.

Senior team
In November 2010, Schürrle received a call up to the senior team. He subsequently made his debut in a friendly against Sweden, appearing as a substitute in the 79th minute. Schürrle and Mario Götze, who came on simultaneously, were the first two German international players to be born in reunified Germany. On 29 May 2011, Schürrle scored his first goal for the senior team, during a friendly against Uruguay in a 2–1 win.

Schürrle was chosen in Germany's squad for their qualification for UEFA Euro 2012. He scored against Azerbaijan in a 3–1 win, on 7 June 2011. On 2 September 2011, he scored again in the 6–2 thrashing victory over Austria, in both cases coming on as a substitute. In the next qualification fixture against Belgium on 11 October 2011, Schürrle was rewarded with his first start in the Euro 2012 qualifiers, and scored in the 33rd minute chipping over Simon Mignolet. After scoring three times during the campaign as Germany won ten out of ten games to top their group in their qualifiers, Schürrle was named in the Germany 23-man squad for UEFA Euro 2012 and was given the number nine shirt. He made his first appearance at Euro 2012 on 17 June, coming on as a substitute in the 64th minute for Lukas Podolski, in the 2–1 win over Denmark.

On 15 October 2013, Schürrle scored a hat-trick in a 5–3 away win against Sweden in 2014 FIFA World Cup qualification.

Schürrle was named in Germany's squad for the 2014 FIFA World Cup. He made his FIFA World Cup debut as a substitute in the team's opening match, a 4–0 victory over Portugal. In the 2–1 victory over Algeria in the round of 16, Schürrle came on for Götze as a half-time substitute and scored the opening goal of the match in the second minute of extra time. On 8 July, he scored Germany's final two goals after replacing Miroslav Klose as a 58th-minute substitute in a 7–1 semi-final victory over Brazil. Schürrle again came on as a substitute in the final against Argentina, replacing the injured Christoph Kramer in the first half. He provided the cross for Götze's winning goal in the 113th minute, as Germany won its fourth World Cup.

During qualification for UEFA Euro 2016, Schürrle scored a hat-trick in a 7–0 away win over Gibraltar on 13 June 2015. His international career ended after 57 appearances in March 2017.

Playing style
Schürrle usually played as a winger but was naturally positioned as a second striker. One of Schürrle's "key assets" was his "long-distance sprinting on the counter-attack." Schürrle also had an excellent fitness level, work-rate and pace. Schürrle was considered to be a "good finisher" and "capable of executing counter-attacks effectively". He often liked to cut inside, shoot from distance and enjoyed time on the ball.
André is also known for his powerful shots outside the box making him a threat to the opposition.

Personal life
Schürrle was born in Ludwigshafen, Rhineland-Palatinate to Luise and Joachim Schürrle. When he was a youngster, he told in an interview with German football magazine 11 Freunde that his idols were Michael Ballack and Raúl. He married Kazakh-born model Anna Sharypova at the end of 2018. Their first child, Kaia Schürrle, was born in April 2019.

Career statistics

Club

International
Appearances and goals by national team and year

Scores and results list Germany's goal tally first.

Honours
Mainz 05 U19

 Under 19 Bundesliga: 2008–09

Chelsea
Premier League: 2014–15

Wolfsburg
DFB-Pokal: 2014–15
DFL-Supercup: 2015

Borussia Dortmund
DFB-Pokal: 2016–17

Germany
FIFA World Cup: 2014
UEFA European Championship third place: 2012

Individual
BBC Goal of the Month: August 2014
Premier League Goal of the Month: January 2019
BBC Goal of the Month: January 2019

References

External links

 

1990 births
Living people
Sportspeople from Ludwigshafen
Footballers from Rhineland-Palatinate
German footballers
Association football forwards
1. FSV Mainz 05 players
Bayer 04 Leverkusen players
Chelsea F.C. players
VfL Wolfsburg players
Borussia Dortmund players
Fulham F.C. players
FC Spartak Moscow players
Bundesliga players
Premier League players
Russian Premier League players
Germany youth international footballers
Germany under-21 international footballers
Germany international footballers
UEFA Euro 2012 players
2014 FIFA World Cup players
UEFA Euro 2016 players
FIFA World Cup-winning players
German expatriate footballers
German expatriate sportspeople in England
German expatriate sportspeople in Russia
Expatriate footballers in England
Expatriate footballers in Russia